Taruka was a village development committee in Nuwakot District in the Bagmati Zone of central Nepal. At the time of the 1991 Nepal census it had a population of 4845 people living in 912 individual households.
Taruka is famous for its vegetable production and annual bullfight. The annual bullfight occurs on first day on tenth month (Makar Sakranti) of Nepali calendar.

References

External links
UN map of the municipalities of Nuwakot District

Populated places in Nuwakot District